Hana Rural District is a rural district (dehestan) in the Central District of Semirom County, Isfahan Province, Iran. At the 2006 census, its population was 2,914, in 648 families.  The rural district has 18 villages.

References 

Rural Districts of Isfahan Province
Semirom County